Tavern is an unincorporated community in Maries County, in the U.S. state of Missouri.

History
A post office called Tavern was established in 1879, and remained in operation until 1933. A variant name was "Humphreys". Besides the post office, the community had Humphrey's country store.

References

Unincorporated communities in Maries County, Missouri
Unincorporated communities in Missouri